The 2022 Rochdale Metropolitan Borough Council election took place as of 5 May 2022. Due to boundary changes, all 60 councillors were elected at the same time. The election took place alongside other local elections across the United Kingdom.

In the previous council election in 2021, Labour maintained its control of the council, holding 45 seats after the election. The Conservatives formed the main opposition with nine seats, with the Liberal Democrats on four councillors and three independent councillors.

Background 

The Local Government Act 1972 created a two-tier system of metropolitan counties and districts covering Greater Manchester, Merseyside, South Yorkshire, Tyne and Wear, the West Midlands, and West Yorkshire starting in 1974. Rochdale was a district of the Greater Manchester metropolitan county. The Local Government Act 1985 abolished the metropolitan counties, with metropolitan districts taking on most of their powers as metropolitan boroughs. The Greater Manchester Combined Authority was created in 2011 and began electing the mayor of Greater Manchester from 2017, which was given strategic powers covering a region coterminous with the former Greater Manchester metropolitan county.

Since its formation, Rochdale has variously been under Labour control, Liberal Democrat control, Conservative control and no overall control. Councillors have predominantly been elected from the Labour Party, Liberal Democrats and the Conservative Party, with some independent councillors also serving.  The council has had an overall Labour majority since the 2011. In the most recent election in 2021, Labour won sixteen seats with 49.4% of the vote, the Conservatives won three seats with 31.5% of the vote and the Liberal Democrats won one with 12.3% of the vote.

Two councillors for the West Heywood ward, Jacqui Beswich and Alan McCarthy, had been originally elected as Labour candidates. They left the Labour Party in 2019 to sit as an independent councillor and a Brexit Party councillor. In June 2021 they both joined the Conservative Party.

Bury council underwent boundary changes ahead of this election. The Local Government Boundary Commission for England determined that the council should continue to elect 60 councillors and designed new election boundaries to reflect population change. The new boundaries include twenty three-member wards.

Electoral process 

The council generally elects its councillors in thirds, with a third being up for election every year for three years, with no election in the fourth year. However, due to a boundary review, all sixty councillors were elected at the same time. The election used plurality block voting, with each ward electing three councillors. Electors were able to vote for up to three candidates, and the three candidates with the most votes in each ward were elected.

All registered electors (British, Irish, Commonwealth and European Union citizens) living in Rochdale aged 18 or over were entitled to vote in the election. People who lived at two addresses in different councils, such as university students with different term-time and holiday addresses, were entitled to be registered for and vote in elections in both local authorities. Voting in-person at polling stations took place from 07:00 to 22:00 on election day, and voters were able to apply for postal votes or proxy votes in advance of the election.

Campaign 
Bernard Wynne, Peter Shore and Simon Footitt established the Middleton Independents Party to contest the election. They said that Middleton was sidelined in favour of Rochdale, and advocated regenerating the town centre and supporting local businesses. In a meeting, they said that if their candidates meant more Conservatives got elected, it "would not be a bad thing". Their application for electoral registration as a party was submitted after the Electoral Commission's deadline.

Previous council composition

Results

Ward Results

Balderstone & Kirkholt

Bamford

Castleton

Central Rochdale

East Middleton

Healey

Hopwood Hall

Kingsway

Littleborough Lakeside

Milkstone & Deeplish

Milnrow & Newhey

Norden

North Heywood

North Middleton

Smallbridge & Firgrove

South Middleton

Spotland & Falinge

Wardle, Shore & West Littleborough

West Heywood

West Middleton

References 

Rochdale Council elections
Rochdale